Odesa Operation may refer to:

Odesa Operation (1919)
Odesa Operation (1920)